tRNA (guanine-N(7)-)-methyltransferase subunit WDR4 is an enzyme that in humans is encoded by the WDR4 gene.

This gene encodes a member of the WD repeat protein family. WD repeats are minimally conserved regions of approximately 40 amino acids typically bracketed by gly-his and trp-asp (GH-WD), which may facilitate formation of heterotrimeric or multiprotein complexes. Members of this family are involved in a variety of cellular processes, including cell cycle progression, signal transduction, apoptosis, and gene regulation. 

This gene is excluded as a candidate for a form of nonsyndromic deafness (DFNB10), but is still a candidate for other disorders mapped to 21q22.3 as well as for the development of Down syndrome phenotypes. Two transcript variants encoding the same protein have been found for this gene.

References

Further reading